Brian Drader (born 1960) is a Canadian stage actor and playwright. He is best known for his plays , about Alfred Kinsey and Clara McMillen, and The Fruit Machine, about the Royal Canadian Mounted Police's controversial 1960s fruit machine project to identify homosexual people.

Originally from Winnipeg, Manitoba, he is currently based in Montreal, Quebec, where he teaches playwriting at the National Theatre School of Canada.

His other plays have included Easter Eggs, TuckTuck, The Author's Voice, The Norbals, Mind of the Iguana, Liar, To Be Frank, Everybody's Business and Curtsy.

Awards
He won the Herman Voaden Playwriting Competition in 1997 for The Norbals.

 was a shortlisted nominee for the Governor General's Award for English-language drama at the 2003 Governor General's Awards, and won the Lambda Literary Award for drama at the 16th Lambda Literary Awards.

References

External links
Brian Drader at the National Theatre School of Canada
Brian Drader official website

1960 births
20th-century Canadian dramatists and playwrights
21st-century Canadian dramatists and playwrights
Canadian male stage actors
Canadian LGBT dramatists and playwrights
Lambda Literary Award for Drama winners
Canadian gay actors
Canadian gay writers
Male actors from Winnipeg
Writers from Winnipeg
Living people
Academic staff of the National Theatre School of Canada
Canadian male dramatists and playwrights
20th-century Canadian male writers
21st-century Canadian male writers
21st-century Canadian LGBT people
Gay dramatists and playwrights